The 1983 United States Senate special election in Washington, was a special election to fill the seat which had been held by longtime Senator Henry Jackson, who unexpectedly died on  Three-term former governor Dan Evans was appointed by Governor John Spellman on  and he won the special election over congressman Mike Lowry on  Jackson had won a sixth term the previous year, so more than five years remained in the term.

The legislature ordered a primary election on  it featured 33 candidates (19 Democrats, 13 Republicans, and one Socialist Labor), setting the modern record for number of candidates in a Washington U.S. Senate election. , this was the last time King County voted for a Republican Senate candidate.

Blanket primary

Candidates

Democratic 
 Mike Lowry, U.S. Representative from the 7th congressional district
 Charles Royer, former Mayor of Seattle
 James R.F. Curdy
 Mike Olmer

Republican 
 Daniel J. Evans, incumbent U.S. Senator
 Lloyd E. Cooney, former KIRO-TV commentator
 Larry Penberthy

Results

General election

Candidates 
 Daniel J. Evans (R), incumbent U.S. Senator
 Mike Lowry (D), U.S. Representative from the 7th congressional district

Results

See also 
 1982 United States Senate elections
 1988 United States Senate elections

References 

1983
United States Senate
Washington 1983
Washington
Washington
United States Senate 1983